"Come to My Window" is a song by American singer-songwriter Melissa Etheridge, released in 1993 as the second single from her fourth studio album, Yes I Am (1993). This was the first song to become a hit after Etheridge publicly announced that she was a lesbian. With the driving force of gay rights, the song gained substantial airplay on radio stations, mostly through call-in requests. The song debuted on the Billboard charts after the first week of its release, reaching number 25 on the chart. The song also charted in Canada, reaching number 13 on the RPM Top Singles chart. It was the second song from Etheridge that earned her a Grammy Award for Best Female Rock Vocal Performance. In 2019, Billboard included "Come to My Window" in its list of the "30 Lesbian Love Songs".

Song information
When the song was being promoted, a portion of the song's beginning was omitted. This was to help accommodate some radio stations that wanted an instrumental beginning rather than a vocal one. The song's lyrics describes the intense love that Etheridge has for another person. It describes situations that she is willing to endure and how happy the other person makes her feel. In addition, the song implicitly alludes to the singer's sexual orientation and activism by the lyrics:

"I don't care what they think.
I don't care what they say.
What do they know about this love, anyway?"

Etheridge tells both in her autobiography and during the interview on the bonus DVD of her greatest hits album that out of all songs she has written, "Come to My Window" is the one that surprises her the most, and that she almost did not put it on the album. She states that while she wrote the song, she did not realize what she was actually writing and that it was not before meeting Tammy Lynn Michaels that she understood what this song means to other people. She also says that it has the best musical bridge part of all her songs.

The sound effect at the beginning was created by Mauricio Fritz Lewak who put coins inside of a pair of clash cymbals. This song was also about her girlfriend at the time.

Critical reception
Dave Sholin from the Gavin Report wrote "Singer/songwriter extraordinaire, Melissa Etheridge is never short on provocative imaginery in any of her songs. She delivers one of her most powerful yet, which is supported by an equally riveting video." Sam Wood from Philadelphia Inquirer felt "Come to My Window" "features the same annoying strummed tag line that seems to infect too much of what is called women's music. Etheridge may have intended to pay homage to her ghettoized sisters, but flaunting the contrived, amateurish chordal figure does nothing to add to the authenticity of the song. It just sinks it."

Music video
The black-and-white music video for "Come to My Window", directed by Samuel Bayer, cuts between a mental patient (Juliette Lewis) and Etheridge playing her guitar and singing. The video also features "child-like" drawings in certain scenes. According to an episode of VH1's Pop Up Video, these drawings were created by a crew member's five-year-old daughter. Additionally, the video was to have included an appearance by a little girl; the mental patient's "lost childhood". While the appearance was filmed, it got lost during editing.

Live performances
Etheridge performed "Come to My Window" during The Concert for New York City, the benefit concert following the September 11, 2001 attacks. 
The song was played by the World Wrestling Federation in the background of a tribute to wrestler Owen Hart who died during a match.

Etheridge also appeared on an episode of The Real Housewives of Beverly Hills, singing "Come to My Window" at a fundraiser for Homeless Not Toothless at Dorit and Paul Kemsley's home.

Track listings
All songs were written by Melissa Etheridge.

 US and UK CD single
 "Come to My Window" – 3:55
 "Ain't It Heavy" (live) – 5:34
 "The Letting Go" (live) – 3:51
 "I'm the Only One" (live) – 5:30

 US and Canadian cassette single
 "Come to My Window" – 3:55
 "Ain't It Heavy" (live) – 5:34

 European and Australian CD single
 "Come to My Window" – 3:55
 "Ain't It Heavy" (live) – 5:34
 "The Letting Go" (live) – 3:51

Credits and personnel
 Vocals and acoustic guitar by Melissa Etheridge
 Drums and percussion by Mauricio Fritz Lewak
 Electric guitar by Waddy Wachtel
 Keyboards by Scott Thurston
 Bass by Pino Palladino
 Engineering by Hugh Padgham
 Assistant engineering by Greg Goldman, John Aguto, Mike Baumgartner
 Mixing by Hugh Padgham
 Mastered by Bob Ludwig at Gateway Mastering

Charts

Weekly charts

Year-end charts

Certifications

Other versions
In 1997, The John Tesh Project featuring Brandon Fields on saxophone, covered the song from their album "Sax All Night."

References

 Greatest Hits: The Road Less Traveled (Bonus DVD)
 Melissa Etheridge and Laura Morton: The Truth Is..., Random House 2002
 The single on amazon.de

1993 songs
1994 singles
Black-and-white music videos
Grammy Award for Best Female Rock Vocal Performance
Island Records singles
LGBT-related songs
Melissa Etheridge songs
Music videos directed by Samuel Bayer
Songs written by Melissa Etheridge